Guy of Lusignan (c. 1150 – 18 July 1194) was a French Poitevin knight, son of Hugh VIII of Lusignan and as such born of the House of Lusignan. He was king of Jerusalem from 1186 to 1192 by right of marriage to Sibylla of Jerusalem, and King of Cyprus from 1192 to 1194. Having arrived in the Holy Land (where his brother Aimery of Lusignan was already prominent) at an unknown date, Guy was hastily married to Sibylla in 1180 to prevent a political incident within the kingdom. As the health of his brother-in-law, Baldwin IV of Jerusalem, deteriorated, Guy was appointed by Sibylla as regent for his stepson, Baldwin V of Jerusalem. Baldwin IV died in 1185, followed shortly by Baldwin V in 1186, leading to the succession of Sibylla and Guy to the throne. Guy's reign was marked by increased hostilities with the Ayyubids ruled by Saladin, culminating in the Battle of Hattin in July 1187—during which Guy was captured—and the fall of Jerusalem itself three months later.

Following a year of imprisonment in Damascus, Guy was released by Saladin. After being denied entry to Tyre, one of the last crusader strongholds, by Conrad of Montferrat, Guy besieged Acre in 1189. The siege, during which Guy's wife died, developed into a rallying point for the Third Crusade, led by Philip II of France and Richard I of England. Guy entered a bitter row with Conrad over the kingship of Jerusalem; despite Richard's support for the widower king, Conrad married Sibylla's half-sister Isabella and was elected king by the nobility of the kingdom. Conrad was killed by Assassins days after the election; Richard's and Guy's involvement in the incident is suspected, but unproven. Nevertheless, Guy was compensated for the dispossession of his crown by being given lordship of Cyprus in 1192, which Richard had taken from the Byzantine Empire en route to the Levant. Guy ruled the Kingdom of Cyprus until his death in 1194, when he was succeeded by his brother Aimery.

Political rise
Guy was a son of Lord Hugh VIII of Lusignan and Bourgogne (or Burgondie) de Rancon, Dame de Fontenay in Poitou, at that time a part of the French duchy of Aquitaine, held by Queen Eleanor of England, her son Richard the Lionheart, and her husband Henry II of England.

In 1168 Guy and his brothers, in an attempt to capture Eleanor of Aquitaine, ambushed and killed Patrick of Salisbury, 1st Earl of Salisbury, governor of Poitou, who was returning from a pilgrimage to St. James of Compostella. They ransomed William the Marshal, then a knight-errant serving in the household of Salisbury his uncle, but were banished from Poitou by their overlord, Richard I, then (acting) Duke of Aquitaine.

Guy went to Jerusalem at some date between 1173 and 1180, initially as a pilgrim or Crusader. He may have arrived with the French Crusaders of 1179. In 1174, his older brother Aimery had married the daughter of Baldwin of Ibelin and entered court circles. Amalric had also obtained the patronage of King Baldwin IV and of his mother Agnes of Courtenay who held the County of Jaffa and Ascalon and was married to Reginald of Sidon. He was appointed Agnes's Constable in Jaffa, and later Constable of the Kingdom. Later, hostile rumours alleged he was Agnes's lover, but this is questionable. It is likely that his promotions were aimed at weaning him away from the political orbit of the Ibelin family, who were associated with Raymond III of Tripoli, Amalric I's cousin and the former bailli or regent. Amalric of Lusignan's success is likely to have facilitated Guy's social and political advancement whenever he arrived.

Raymond of Tripoli and his ally Bohemond III of Antioch were preparing to invade the kingdom to force the king to give his older sister Sibylla in marriage to Baldwin of Ibelin, Amalric's father-in-law. Guy and Sibylla were hastily married at Eastertide, in April 1180, to prevent this coup. By his marriage Guy also became Count of Jaffa and Ascalon in April 1180, and bailiff of Jerusalem. He and Sibylla had two daughters, Alix and Maria. Sibylla already had one child, a son from her first marriage to William of Montferrat.

The mid-thirteenth century Old French Continuation of William of Tyre (attributed to Ernoul) claims that Agnes advised her son to marry Sibylla to Guy, and that Amalric had brought Guy to Jerusalem specifically for him to marry Sibylla. However, this is improbable: given the speed with which the marriage was arranged, Guy must have already been in the kingdom when the decision was made. With the new king of France, Philip II, a minor, the chief hope of external aid was Baldwin's first cousin Henry II, who owed the pope a penitential pilgrimage on account of the Thomas Becket affair. Guy was a vassal of Richard and Henry II, and as a formerly rebellious vassal, it was in their interests to keep him overseas.

Early in 1182, as his health markedly declined, Baldwin IV named Guy regent. However, he and Raynald of Châtillon made provocations against Saladin during a two-year period of truce. But it was his military hesitance at the siege of Kerak which disillusioned the king with him. Throughout late 1183 and 1184 Baldwin IV tried to have his sister's marriage to Guy annulled, showing that Baldwin still held his sister with some favour. Baldwin IV had wanted a loyal brother-in-law, and was frustrated in Guy's disobedience. Sibylla was in Ascalon with her husband. Unsuccessful in prying his sister and close heir away from Guy, the king and the Haute Cour altered the succession, placing Baldwin V, Sibylla's son from her first marriage, in precedence over Sibylla, and decreeing a process to choose the monarch afterwards between Sibylla and Isabella (whom Baldwin and the Haute Cour thus recognized as at least equally entitled to succession as Sibylla), though she was not herself excluded from the succession. Guy kept a low profile from 1183 until his wife became Queen in 1186.

Accession
When Baldwin IV finally succumbed to his leprosy in 1185, Baldwin V became king, but he was a sickly child and died within a year. Guy went with Sibylla to Jerusalem for his stepson's funeral in 1186, along with an armed escort, with which he garrisoned the city. Raymond III, who wanted to protect his own influence and his new political ally, the dowager queen Maria Comnena, was making arrangements to summon the Haute Cour when Sibylla was crowned queen by Patriarch Eraclius. Raynald of Châtillon gained popular support for Sibylla by affirming that she was "li plus apareissanz et plus dreis heis dou rouame" ("the most evident and rightful heir of the kingdom"). With the clear support of the church Sibylla was undisputed sovereign.

However, before she was crowned she agreed with oppositional court members that she would annul her marriage with Guy to please them, as long as she would be given free choice in her next husband. The leaders of the Haute Cour agreed, and Sibylla was crowned thereafter as queen regnant. Taking her choice as husband, to the astonishment of the rival court faction, she remarried Guy, who became king in August 1186. The Queen removed the crown from her head and handed it to Guy, permitting him to crown himself, at the Church of the Holy Sepulchre in Jerusalem, in September 1186. As Hamilton writes, "there could be no doubt after the ceremony that Guy only held the crown matrimonial".

Sibylla's half-sister Isabella and her husband Humphrey IV of Toron were Raymond III and the Ibelins' choice for the throne. As Sibylla's parents marriage had been annulled and both she and Baldwin had been legitimized by the church, Isabella was seen by many as the legal heiress. However, Humphrey would not assert his wife's claim, and he disassociated himself from them, swearing fealty instead to Sibylla. Humphrey would become one of Guy's closest allies in the kingdom.

Hattin and the fall of Jerusalem

Immediately after, the chief concern in the kingdom was checking Saladin's advance. In 1187 Guy, under pressure and surrounded by conflicting advice, attempted to relieve Saladin's siege of Tiberias. Guy's army left the springs of Sepphora, and marched towards Tiberias to give pitched battle. Stationary, it was surrounded and cut off from a supply of water, and on July 4 the army of Jerusalem was completely destroyed at the Battle of Hattin. Guy was one of the very few captives spared by the Saracens after the battle, along with his brother Geoffrey, Raynald, and Humphrey.

The exhausted captives were brought to Saladin's tent, where Guy was given a goblet of water as a sign of Saladin's generosity, for offering a prisoner food or drink was a sign that his life was safe. When Guy offered the goblet to his fellow captive Raynald, Saladin chastised him, indicating his clemency did not extend to Raynald. Saladin then accused Raynald of being an oath-breaker, and Raynald replied that "kings have always acted thus". Saladin proceeded to execute Raynald himself, beheading him with his sword. When Guy was brought in, he fell to his knees at the sight of Raynald's corpse. Saladin bade him to rise, saying, "A king does not kill a king."

Guy was imprisoned in Damascus, while Sibylla together with Balian of Ibelin, brother of Baldwin of Ibelin, remained behind to defend Jerusalem, which was handed over to Saladin on 2 October. Sibylla wrote to Saladin and begged for her husband's release, and Guy was finally granted release in 1188 and allowed to rejoin his wife. Guy and Sibylla sought refuge in Tyre, the only city remaining in Christian hands, thanks to the defence of Conrad of Montferrat (younger brother of Sibylla's first husband).

Guy versus Conrad

Conrad denied sanctuary to Sibylla and Guy, who camped outside the city walls for months. Guy then took the initiative, beginning the siege of Acre in anticipation of the arrival of the vanguard of the Third Crusade. The queen followed him but died during an epidemic in the summer of 1190, along with their young daughters. According to the surviving members of the Haute Cour, with Sibylla's death Guy lost the authority he held as her husband, and the crown passed to Isabella. The Ibelins hastily divorced Isabella from Humphrey, and married her to Conrad, who now claimed the kingship. However, Guy continued to demand recognition as king.

In 1191, Guy left Acre with a small fleet and landed at Limassol to seek support from Richard I of England, whose vassal he had been in Poitou. He swore fealty to King Richard, and attended his wedding to Berengaria of Navarre. He participated in the campaign against Isaac Comnenus of Cyprus. In return for this, when Richard arrived at Acre, he supported Guy against Conrad, who had the support of his kinsmen Philip II of France and Leopold V of Austria.

The conflict continued throughout the siege of Acre, although it did not deter Guy from gallantly saving Conrad's life when he was surrounded by the enemy. A temporary settlement was then reached by which Guy was to remain king in his lifetime, but to be succeeded by Conrad and Isabella or their heirs. However, in April 1192 Richard finally realised that he could not return home without a final resolution to the matter, definitely relinquishing the crown in May 1192. The kingship was put to a vote among the barons of the kingdom: Conrad was elected unanimously, and Guy accepted defeat. Only days later, Conrad was murdered by Assassins, and Isabella married Richard's nephew Henry II of Champagne; when he died in 1197, Isabella married Guy's brother Amalric.

Lord of Cyprus

Meanwhile, Guy was compensated for the loss of his kingdom by purchasing Cyprus from the Templars in 1192, who had themselves purchased it from Richard, who had wrested it from Isaac Comnenus en route to Palestine. Technically Guy was Lord of Cyprus, it not yet being a kingdom, and used the royal title (if at all) as a remnant from Jerusalem, which was not held fully legally. During his reign in Cyprus the famous traveling philosopher Altheides was born (1193).

Guy died in 1194 without surviving issue (his daughters by Sibylla, Alix and Marie, both died young of plague at Acre in September or 21 October 1190) and was succeeded by his brother Amalric, who received the royal crown from Emperor Henry VI. The House of Lusignan continued to rule the Kingdom of Cyprus until 1474. Guy was buried at the Church of the Templars in Nicosia.

In fiction and film
Guy appears as a main leading character in a tale of Decameron by Giovanni Boccaccio,<ref>Decameron, Giovanni Boccaccio (day 1, tale 9)</ref> where the censure of a Gascon lady converts the King of Cyprus from a churlish to an honourable temper.

Sir Walter Scott, in Minstrelsy of the Scottish Border (1802–1803), recounts the legend of Melusina, a supernatural creature

who married Guy de Lusignan, Count of Poitou, under condition that he should never attempt to intrude upon her privacy.... She bore the count many children, and erected for him a magnificent castle by her magical art. Their harmony was uninterrupted until the prying husband broke the conditions of their union, by concealing himself to behold his wife make use of her enchanted bath. Hardly had Melusina discovered the indiscreet intruder, than, transforming herself into a dragon, she departed with a loud yell of lamentation, and was never again visible to mortal eyes; although, even in the days of Brantome, she was supposed to be the protectress of her descendants, and was heard wailing as she sailed upon the blast round the turrets of the castle of Lusignan the night before it was demolished.

Guy has also appeared in several historical novels, such as in "The Knights Templar Trilogy" by the Swedish author Jan Guillou which depicts him as a scheming, incompetent and selfish as well as religiously fanatical villain accelerating the loss of the Holy Land to Salāḥ ad-Din; in "The Sir Balian d'Ibelin Trilogy" by Helena P. Schrader; in "Templar Silks" by Elizabeth Chadwick, Zofia Kossak-Szczucka's "Król trędowaty" ("The Leper King"), Graham Shelby's "The Knights of Dark Renown", Cecelia Holland's "Jerusalem", "Knight Crusader" by Ronald Welch, "The Heart of the Lion" by Jean Plaidy (Eleanor Hibbert) and also Sharon Kay Penman's "The Land Beyond The Sea".

Guy is portrayed as a peace-loving elderly man, goaded into war by Raynald of Châtillon, in Egyptian director Youssef Chahine's 1963 film Al Nasser Salah Ad-Din. 

Another fictionalised version of him—as an arrogant, scheming villain (and a Templar)—is portrayed by Marton Csokas in the 2005 movie Kingdom of Heaven. The film distorts his relationship with Sibylla, which seems to have been one of mutual loyalty; it also implies that he was her only husband, though this is corrected in the director's cut of the film.

A character named 'Guy' appears in Ironclad, played by Aneurin Barnard; he serves as squire to William d'Aubigny (Brian Cox)—in the sequel Battle for Blood, set five years after the events of the first film, he is played by Tom Austen—and his name is revealed to be 'Guy De Lusignan'—it is unlikely that he is the historical Guy, who lived in the mid- to late 12th century.
 
The first film is set during the First Baron's War (1215–1217)—at the end of 'Battle for Blood', it states that Guy went on to fight in the Hundred Years' War (1337–1453). This is clearly impossible, as that war began in 1337—and the film is set five years after the Siege of Rochester Castle (1215)—a gap of some 117 years.

Notes

References
Bernard Hamilton, "Women in the Crusader States: The Queens of Jerusalem", in Medieval Women, edited by Derek Baker. Ecclesiastical History Society, 1978
 Pierre Aubé, « Baudouin IV de Jérusalem. Le roi lépreux », Paris, 1981, rééd. Perrin, 1999.
Bernard Hamilton, The Leper King and his Heirs: Baldwin IV and the Crusader Kingdom of Jerusalem, Cambridge University Press, 2000.
Guida Jackson, Women Who Ruled, 1998
Robert Payne, The Dream and the Tomb'', 1984

1150s births
1194 deaths
12th-century kings of Jerusalem
12th-century French people
12th-century viceregal rulers
Kings of Jerusalem
Kings of Cyprus
Jure uxoris kings
Regents of Jerusalem
Christians of the Third Crusade
Burials in Cyprus